Donald Cockatoo-Collins (born 1 April 1978) is a former Australian rules footballer who played with Melbourne in the Australian Football League (AFL).

Cockatoo-Collins, an Indigenous Australian, is a younger brother of Che Cockatoo-Collins and twin brother of David Cockatoo-Collins both from Cairns, Queensland. He made nine appearances for Melbourne, over three seasons.

References

External links
 
 

1978 births
Australian rules footballers from South Australia
Melbourne Football Club players
Port Adelaide Football Club (SANFL) players
Port Adelaide Football Club players (all competitions)
Indigenous Australian players of Australian rules football
Australian twins
Twin sportspeople
Living people